Fort High School Thiruvananthapuram is a government-aided school in  Trivandrum, Kerala.

References

External links
 Facebook page

High schools and secondary schools in Thiruvananthapuram